The 2013–14 Lebanese Premier League is the 53rd season of top-tier football in Lebanon. A total of twelve teams are competing in the league, with Safa the defending champions. The season kicked off on 21 September 2013 and will finish around June 2014.

Teams 
Shabab Al-Ghazieh and Salam Sour were relegated to the second level of Lebanese football after ending the 2012–13 season in the bottom two places. They were replaced by Al-Mabarrah, back after one campaign away after relegation in the 2011–12 league campaign. Salam Zgharta were also promoted and back for the first time since relegation in 2008–09.

Stadia and locations

Foreign players

 Those players who were born and started their professional career abroad but have since gained Lebanon Residency.
 Foreign players who left their clubs after first half of the season.

League table

References

2013–14 Lebanese Premier League
Lebanese Premier League seasons
Leb
1